Miss World Myanmar also known as Miss Myanmar or Miss Myanmar World is a national pageant to select Myanmar's representative to the Miss World pageant. This pageant is unrelated to the Miss Universe Myanmar, Miss International Myanmar or Miss Golden Land Myanmar national contests.

Titleholders

Winner

Winners by City/Town

Runner-up

International pageants

Miss World

Winner Gallery

See also 
 Miss Burma (1947–1962)
 Miss Universe Myanmar
 Miss International Myanmar
 Miss Earth Myanmar
 Miss Supranational Myanmar
 Mister Myanmar
 Miss Grand Myanmar

References

External links
Official page

Myanmar
Recurring events established in 1960
Burmese awards
Beauty pageants in Myanmar